The Movement of Socialist Affirmation was formed in 1989 by left Christian elements of IU. Leaders included Henry Pease, Rolando Ames and Gloria Helfer. It worked within IU in the 1989 and 1990 elections. In 1992 it broke with IU, and was one of the organizations founding MDI. MAS worked with MDI in the 1992 and 1993 elections. In the 1993 referendum, it supported the No.

MAS is no longer functioning.

Defunct political parties in Peru
Political parties established in 1989
Socialist parties in Peru
1989 establishments in Peru
Political parties with year of disestablishment missing